Gregory Hogeboom (born September 26, 1982) is a Canadian former professional ice hockey player. He last played for the Brampton Beast in the Central Hockey League. Hogeboom was selected by the Los Angeles Kings in the 5th round (152nd overall) of the 2002 NHL Entry Draft.

College career 

Hogeboom played junior hockey for the Caledon Canadians and the Wexford Raiders of the Ontario Provincial Junior A Hockey League before signing to play US college hockey for Miami University in Oxford, Ohio, in 2000.  At Miami, the RedHawks went the 23–14–4 (.610) in 2003–04 in his senior season to the 2004 NCAA Division I Men's Ice Hockey Tournament, losing 3–2 in the regional semi-final to eventual national champion Denver at the World Arena in Colorado Springs. The team was led by Derek Edwardson (2nd-Team All-American, 48 points) and Hogeboom (42 points).  Hogeboom totaled 120 points over 156 games in his Miami career.

Professional career 

Graduating from Miami, Hogeboom turned professional and spent the next three seasons in the Kings' farm system with the Reading Royals of the ECHL and the Manchester Monarchs of the American Hockey League, scoring 74 points (30 goals) with Reading in 2006–07.  Hogeboom pursued overseas opportunities with the EHC Visp and HC Thurgau of the Swiss National League B for two seasons, before returning to the ECHL in 2009–10 with the Ontario Reign.  He had his best professional season with the Texas Brahmas of the Central Hockey League (CHL) in 2010–11 with 91 points (37 goals).  Hogeboom returned to Europe for 2011–12 with HC Alleghe of the Italian Hockey League before returning to professional hockey for a three-game stint with the Brampton Beast of the CHL in 2013–14. He retired after the 2013–14 season.

Personal life 

Hogeboom graduated with a degree in finance from Miami University and currently works for the La-Z-Boy company in Toronto, Ontario, where he lives with his family.

Awards and honours

Career statistics

References

External links

1982 births
Living people
Canadian ice hockey forwards
Fort Worth Brahmas players
HC Alleghe players
Los Angeles Kings draft picks
Manchester Monarchs (AHL) players
Miami RedHawks men's ice hockey players
Ontario Reign (ECHL) players
Reading Royals players
Sportspeople from Etobicoke
Ice hockey people from Toronto
Canadian expatriate ice hockey players in Italy